Orazio Rancati (born 9 March 1940) is an Italian footballer. He competed in the men's tournament at the 1960 Summer Olympics.

References

External links
 

1940 births
Living people
Italian footballers
Olympic footballers of Italy
Footballers at the 1960 Summer Olympics
Footballers from Lombardy
Association football midfielders
Imolese Calcio 1919 players
Sondrio Calcio players